Monte Gavia is a mountain of the Sobretta-Gavia Group in Lombardy, Italy. It has an elevation of 3,223 metres  and towers above the Gavia Pass.

References

Mountains of Lombardy
Mountains of the Alps
Alpine three-thousanders